Mediodactylus heteropholis, also known as the Iraqi gecko or Iraqi keel-scaled gecko, is a species of lizard in the family Gekkonidae. It is endemic to northeastern Iraq and western Iran.

References

Mediodactylus
Reptiles described in 1970